Trinity Hospice is a purpose-built hospice on Low Moor Road (formerly Low Moor Lane) in Greenlands, Bispham, Blackpool, Lancashire, England. It is set in landscaped gardens and it has a central courtyard.  It was opened in 1985 after several years of planning and fund raising led by Dr David Cooper. Built on a former horse paddock and marsh land and stream.  It has grown from the original in-patient unit to include a day-patient unit, a children's unit, a study centre and a community care centre.

All of the hospice's patient areas are on the ground floor.  The Hospice includes two wards for the in-patient palliative care of 28 adults in three or four bedded bays and single rooms.  It also includes Brian House which is a separate unit for the in-patient palliative care of five children in single rooms.  There are also 24 day-patient places.

References

External links
Official website

Hospices in England
Buildings and structures in Blackpool
Charities based in Lancashire
Health in Lancashire